The Wah Medical College (WMC) is a medical college located at Wah Cantonment, Punjab, Pakistan. 

The college is located at Jinnah Avenue in the centre of the Educational zone of Wah Cantonment POF Hospital is attached to the college as a teaching hospital. It is a part of a composite medical education program being run by the Pakistan Ordnance Factories Welfare Trust (POFWT) and Pakistan Ordnance Factories Board Wah Cantonment (POFBWC).

Recognition and affiliation 
 This college is approved by the Pakistan Medical and Dental Council (PMDC).  
 Wah Medical College is affiliated with the University of Health Sciences, Lahore.

Campus
The college campus covers almost 200 Kanals of land, adjacent to its teaching hospital, POF hospital.

Departments

Medical Education
Anatomy
Physiology
Biochemistry
Pathology
Pharmacology
Community Medicine
Forensic Medicine
Behavioral Science
General medicine
General surgery
Ophthalmology
ENT
Anesthesiology
Pediatrics
Dermatology
Obstetrics and gynaecology
Radiotherapy
Urology
Neurosurgery
Orthopedics

See also
List of medical schools in Pakistan
Pakistan Ordnance Factories
University of Wah
Wah Engineering College

References

External links
WMC official website
University Directory
POF (Pakistan Ordnance Factories) Wah Cantt.

Medical colleges in Punjab, Pakistan
Educational institutions established in 2002
Academic institutions in Pakistan
2002 establishments in Pakistan